Diego Goldim (born 15 November 1981, in Porto Alegre), known as just Diego Gaúcho, is a Brazilian footballer as a defender. Previously he played for Gil Vicente F.C. and in the first half of 2011 for the Romanian Liga I team FC Brașov.

References

1981 births
Living people
Brazilian footballers
Footballers from Porto Alegre
Brazilian expatriate footballers
Association football central defenders
Sport Club Barueri players
Santa Cruz Futebol Clube players
Clube 15 de Novembro players
Gil Vicente F.C. players
U.D. Leiria players
FC Brașov (1936) players
FC Astra Giurgiu players
Moreirense F.C. players
Primeira Liga players
Liga I players
Cypriot First Division players
Expatriate footballers in Romania
Expatriate footballers in Cyprus